was the fourth Shikken (1242–1246) of the Kamakura shogunate. He was son of Hōjō Tokiuji and of a former wife of Adachi Kagemori, elder brother of Hōjō Tokiyori and grandson of Hōjō Yasutoki. He ruled from 1242 to 1246 and founded Kōmyō-ji in Zaimokuza. He is buried within the temple.

References 
 

1224 births
1246 deaths
Hōjō clan
Adachi clan
People of Kamakura-period Japan